Kahatowita (Sinhala:කහටෝවිට Tamil:கஹடோவிட) is a village in the Attanagalla electorate, Gampaha District, Western Province, Sri Lanka.

Geography and Climate

Kahatowita features a tropical rain forest climate under the Köppen climate classification. Kahatowita’s climate is normally temperate throughout the year.

Local Government Administration

Kahatowita, the village, is a historical village being administered by Attanagalla Divisional Secretariat, which is one of the electorate divisions administered under the Gampaha District. It has been divided into two divisions for two different "Grama Niladari" (Village officers) for easy administration, Kahatowita and Kahatowita South.

Religion

The ever first mosque of the village was built close to the Attanagalla Oya (Ovitta) in 1688. Eventually, the mosque had to be moved to another area, as it was affected by frequent flooding. Now, this mosque is called the Kahatowita Grand Masjidh (Muhiyiddeen Jumma Mosque). The mosque is used for daily prayers and for other religious and social activities. The second mosque, Masjidun Noor, was built in 1975. In 1997, Jamiuth Tawheed Masjid was built as third mosque in the area. Majority of the villagers followed Sufi Tariqas, namely Qadiriyatun Nabawiyya, badheebiyyatul Qadiriyya, and Shaduliyah.

Assayed Ahmed Mubarak, a scholar from Hadramaut, Yemen who introduced Qadiriyatun Nabawiyya tariqa, visited Kahatowita in 1857, while Sheikh Abdullah Ibn Umar Badeeb al Yamani, a scholar from Hadramaut, Yemen visited the village in 1859 to preach Islam and to educate the people of the village. Later, badheebiyyatul Qadiriyya tariqa was introduced to the people as a result of his visit. He established a takkiya near to Muhiyiddeen Jumma mosque and formed and started Zikr Majlise and Islamic Classes to attract the people to Masjidhs. He founded Kahatowita Al-Badriya Maha Vidyalaya, the first school in Kahatowita in 1891. He was also a founder of Zahira College, Colombo.

The people who followed Shaduliya tariqa was brought to the village by Sheikh Ibrahimul Makki in 1928. He opened a zaviya in Kahatowita.

Education

There are two government schools in Kahatowita. They are Al-Badriya Maha Vidyala and Kahatowita Muslim Balika Vidyala. Al-Badriya Maha Vidyala was founded in 1891 by Sheikh Abdullah Ibn Umar Badeeb al Yamani.It later advanced government school in 1920. Al-Badriya Maha Vidyalaya provides education up to GCE Advanced Level.

Kahatowita Muslim Balika Vidyalaya was established in 1946. Muslim Balika School provides education for Muslim girls up to GCE Ordinary Level. Badeebiyya Arabic school is also another non-governmental (Arabic) College in Kahatowita, which provides Islamic religious education as well. Muaskarurrahman Ladies Arabic college provides Islamic religious education to Muslim women. Mustafawiyyah Ahadiya school (Daham Pasala), established in 2006, provides basic Islamic education for students. Kahatowita has a literacy rate of 98%.

Students from the area School (Al Badriya) participate in many zonal and district level competitions representing the village.

See also
Gampaha District
Western Province, Sri Lanka
Attanagalla Divisional Secretariat

References

External links
http://www.attanagalla.ds.gov.lk/ Attanagalla Divisional Secrertarat

Gampaha District
Populated places in Western Province, Sri Lanka